William Murphy (12 February 1892 – 16 November 1967) was an Irish Fine Gael politician and Teachta Dála (TD) for Clare from 1951 until his death in 1967.

Biography
A publican before entering politics, Murphy was an unsuccessful Fine Gael candidate in Clare at the 1937 general election. He did not stand again until the 1951 general election, when he was elected to the 14th Dáil. He was re-elected at the next four general elections, in 1954, 1957, 1961 and in 1965.

William Murphy died 16 November 1967, and the resulting by-election for his seat in the 18th Dáil was held on 14 March 1968. It was won by the Fianna Fáil candidate, Sylvester Barrett, leaving Fine Gael with no TDs in Clare until Frank Taylor won a seat at the 1969 general election.

References

1892 births
1967 deaths
Fine Gael TDs
Members of the 14th Dáil
Members of the 15th Dáil
Members of the 16th Dáil
Members of the 17th Dáil
Members of the 18th Dáil